Athletics at the 2019 African Games was held from 26 to 30 August 2019 in Rabat, Morocco.

Medal summary

Men

Women

Medal table

Schedule

Participating nations 

 (11)
 (3)
 (5)
 (23)
 (15)
 (7)
 (13)
 (5)
 (1)
 (6)
 (8)
 (9)
 (30)
 (6)
 (15)
 (3)
 (80)
 (2)
 (9)
 (16)
 (3)
 (11)
 (69)
 (7)
 (1)
 (2)
 (4)
 (7)
 (11)
 (1)
 (13)
 (44)
 (2)
 (17)
 (3)
 (48)
 (10)
 (2)
 (4)
 (13)
 (8)
 (10)
 (2)
 (33)
 (8)
 (4)
 (6)
 (6)
 (14)
 (25)
 (7)
 (15)

References 
 Results book

External links
 Official results
 Results book

 
2019 African Games
African Games
2019 African Games
2019